The Awami Workers Party is a left-wing socialist political party in Pakistan. The party seeks to unify the struggles of workers, peasants, students, women and ethnic and religious minorities in Pakistan under the banner of a democratic and socialist political system. After the death of the AWP's founding leader Fanoos Gujjar in 2018, Senior Vice President Yousuf Mustikhan became its president.

History

Foundation 
The party was formed on November 11, 2012, as a merger of Labour Party Pakistan, Workers Party Pakistan and Awami Party Pakistan. While not the first attempt to unify the Left, the AWP generated excitement among progressives due to its promise of building upon the left's best traditions and making adaptations necessary for a viable project.

Federal Congress 
The party held its First Federal Congress on September 27–28, 2014 in Islamabad and elected its national leadership following sub-national party elections around the country. Abid Hassan Minto was elected as president, Fanoos Gujjar as chairman and Farooq Tariq as general secretary.

The Second Federal Congress was held on October 15-16, 2016 in Karachi. Fanoos Gujjar, was elected as the president and Akhter Hussain (former president Sindh Bar Council) as general secretary.

Third central party congress was held on 12-13 March, 2022 in Lahore in which Yousuf Mustikhan was elected as president, Akhtar Hussain as Senior Vice President, Bakhshal Thalho as general secretary and Aasim Sajjad Akhtar as deputy general secretary.

General elections

General elections 2013 
In the 2013 Pakistani general election the party received 18,650 votes or 0.04% of the national share.

Elections 2015 
AWP took part in the 2015 elections in Gilgit-Baltistan. Baba Jan was AWP's candidate in GBLA-6 constituency. Jan came second to PMLN's Mir Gazanfar Ali. New elections in GBLA-6 were expected to be held in September 2016 after the seat became vacant on Mir Gazanfar's appointment as Governor. But Baba Jan's paper got rejected and Akhun Bhai contested the by polls in place of Baba Jan.

General Elections 2018 
In the 2018 Pakistani general election, AWP received 35,870 votes.
In July, 2018, at the Karachi Press Club, secretary general, advocate Akhtar Hussain, and senior vice president Yousuf Mustikhan, issued the party’s 10-point agenda as their manifesto. The main focus of manifesto was abolishing the medieval tribal and feudal system in the country.

From  the federal capital Islamabad, Ammar Rashid (president AWP Punjab) ran for the National Assembly seat NA-53 and Ismat Shahjahan (deputy general secretary AWP), for the National Assembly seat NA-54.

Fanoos Gujjar contested elections from his native constituency, Buner in Khyber Pakhtunkhwa.

GB Elections 2020 
In the 2020 GB Elections, Baba Jan submitted papers as primary candidate for the GBA-6 Hunza seat and Asif Saeed Sakhi as Jan's covering candidate. Jan’s candidature was rejected and Sakhi contested the elections on AWP ticket. He got 2,612 votes and came fifth in the polls.

Notable Events

Blocking of Party's Website 
AWP website was blocked on June 3, 2018. On June 6, 2018, party submitted application to Election Commission of Pakistan to urgently remove the block from party's official website. On February 18, 2019, AWP filed a petition in Islamabad High Court (IHC) against censorship of its website by Pakistan Telecommunication Authority (PTA). On September 12, 2019, the IHC ruled that the blocking of website  was in violation of natural justice according to Article 10-A in the Constitution of Pakistan.

Decease of Fanoos Gujjar 
Fanoos Gujjar, the founding member of AWP and served as chairman of the party from 2012 to 2016, and president of the party from 2016 till his death. He died on December 1, 2018 due to cardiac arrest in his native village Riyal, Union Council Batala, district Buner. He was suffering from multiple diseases and left with just one kidney since ten years.

Departure of LPP member 
In October 2019, one member of Labour Party announced its resignation from the AWP. LPP leader and former AWP General Secretary Farooq Tariq alleged that his group was being "witch-hunted" in the party, and said that the party had been reluctant to work with farmers', workers' and democratic movements, or to campaign for the release of political prisoner Baba Jan, a leading AWP member.

Release of Baba Jan and other workers 
Baba Jan, the former vice-president AWP and now member of the Federal Committee was sentenced to seventy one years in jail along with 14 people by the Gilgit-Baltistan courts on charges of terrorism for inciting public against the state during the Aliabad incident. He was released from jail after nine years on November 27, 2020 after a week-long Aliabad sit in by the families of the prisoners.

Party Leadership 
Abid Hassan Minto
Fanoos Gujjar (deceased)
Yousuf Mustikhan
Akhtar Hussain
Abida Chaudhary
Baba Jan (politician)
Ismat Shahjahan 
Aasim Sajjad Akhtar
Bakhshal Thalho
Alia Amirali
Alya Bakhshal
Ammar Rashid
Javed Akhtar
Farhat Abbas

References

External links

 
Socialist parties in Pakistan
Political parties established in 2012
Labour history of Pakistan
Secularism in Pakistan
Far-left politics in Pakistan
2012 establishments in Pakistan